Matt Franzen is an American college football coach and former college athletic administrator. He is the head football coach at Hastings College in Hastings, Nebraska, a position he had held since December 2020. Franzen was the head football coach at Doane College in Crete, Nebraska from 2007 to 2017, compiling a record of 65–49. He was also the athletic director at Doane from 2018 to 2020.

Head coaching record

References

Year of birth missing (living people)
Living people
American football offensive linemen
Doane Tigers athletic directors
Doane Tigers football players
Doane Tigers football coaches
Hastings Broncos football coaches
Hastings College alumni